777 – The Desanctification is the ninth full-length album by French black metal band Blut Aus Nord. It was released on November 11, 2011 through Debemor Morti Productions. It is the second album of the '777 Trilogy'. The album was recorded, mixed, and mastered at Earthbound Studios, and the artwork was created by Valnoir of Metastazis.

Writing, composition
The album was written and performed entirely by Vindsval. He explained that "The trilogy 777 is a very personal project – it was absolutely impossible for me to let someone else work on it. It was the same thing for MoRT – this is my soul and my flesh." In an interview with Invisible Oranges, Vindsval described the concept behind the album:

Critical reception

The album was received well by critics, with particular praise being offered towards the album's unpredictable nature and complex songwriting. Stereogum's Tom Breihan named it 'Album of the Week' following its release, describing it as "a forbidding slab of unadorned hate, compellingly rendered. It’s the sort of thing that can send you into a staring-into-nothingness zone-out for periods of time long enough to make your loved ones uncomfortable."

Pitchfork's Brandon Stosuy picked '777 – Sect(s)' and '777 – The Desanctification' as the two best metal albums of 2011, writing that "Beyond the experimentation, both of these records also really move-- you could almost dance to the latter." The albums were also featured on the site's honourable mentions for overall album of the year by Philip Sherburne.

Track listing

References

2011 albums
Blut Aus Nord albums